This is a comprehensive discography of official recordings by Mushroomhead, an eight-member heavy metal band from Cleveland, Ohio. Mushroomhead have released eight studio albums, two remix albums, one compilation album, eighteen singles, six B-sides, twenty-six music videos, and four video albums.

Albums

Studio albums

Compilations

Remix albums

Demo albums

Unreleased albums

Video albums

Singles

Music videos 

List of music videos, showing year released and director

Notes

A  XX is sometimes considered a compilation album, but it was promoted and charted as an official studio album.

References

Discographies of American artists
Heavy metal group discographies